Giovanni Bernaudeau (born 25 August 1983 in Fontenay-le-Comte, Vendée) is a French former road bicycle racer, who competed professionally between 2005 and 2015, for the  team and its previous iterations. He is the son of former professional cyclist Jean-René Bernaudeau.

Major results 

2004
 2nd Paris–Tours Espoirs
2008
 6th Overall La Tropicale Amissa Bongo
2011
 10th Overall Paris–Corrèze
2014
 9th Overall La Tropicale Amissa Bongo
2015
 2nd Overall La Tropicale Amissa Bongo
1st  Mountains classification

References

External links 
Europcar Profile

1983 births
Living people
People from Fontenay-le-Comte
French male cyclists
Sportspeople from Vendée
Cyclists from Pays de la Loire